The Sq'éwlets First Nation (Scowlitz) is the band government of Skaulits subgroup of the Stó:lō people located on Harrison Bay in the Upper Fraser Valley region between Chehalis (E) and Lake Errock, British Columbia, Canada (W).  They are a member government of the Stó:lō Tribal Council.

The first nation was formerly known as Scowlitz First Nation.

Indian Reserves

Indian Reserves under the administration of the Cowlitz First Nation are:
Williams Indian Reserve No. 2, at the outlet of Harrison Bay, adjacent to Harrison Mills, 9.7 ha. 
Scowlitz Indian Reserve No. 1, at the outlet of Harrison Bay, adjacent to Harrison Mills, 69.0 ha. 
Squawkum Creek Indian Reserve No. 3, at the southwest corner of Harrison Bay, 158.0 ha.

Qithyll/Harrison Knob archaeological site
The Scowlitz First Nation are partners in an archaeological dig covering Harrison Hill and its subpeak Harrison Knob, known to them as Qithyll, which is an ancient graveyard containing unusual burial mounds known as the Scowlitz Mounds or Fraser Valley Pyramids.  The site contains 198 pyramids in 15 distinct clusters.

References

Sto:lo governments
First Nations governments in the Lower Mainland